Asphodeline tenuior, the thin asphodeline, is a species of plant in the family Asphodelaceae, subfamily Asphodeloideae. It is native to the Caucasus (southern Russia, Georgia, Armenia, Azerbaijan), as well as from eastern Turkey and northwestern Iran. Within Russia, it is known from eastern Krasnodar Krai, Karachay-Cherkessia, Stavropol Krai and western Kabardino-Balkaria. It can be found on stony slopes and scree on limestone and sandstone, from elevations of 500–1,000 m. It is threatened by habitat loss and degradation, due to lime pits, slope terracing and cattle pasturing.

Subspecies and varieties
 Asphodeline tenuior var. puberulenta Tuzlaci - eastern Turkey
 Asphodeline tenuior subsp. tenuiflora (K.Koch) Tuzlaci - Turkey, Iran, south Caucasus
 Asphodeline tenuior subsp. tenuior - north and south Caucasus

Tenual and tenucarb are two natural products, built around a 3-benzoxepin core, which have been isolated from A. tenuior and A. taurica.

References

Asphodeloideae
Vulnerable plants
Flora of Russia
Plants described in 1819